Hangrai is a village and union council (an administrative subdivision) of Mansehra District in the Khyber-Pakhtunkhwa province of Pakistan. It is located in the lower Kaghan Valley and lies to the north of Balakot city in an area that was affected by the 2005 Kashmir earthquake.

Gujjars are the main tribe living in this UC with a considerable percentage of Swatis, Mughals and Syeds.  The literacy rate is very low.  It is the most affected UC in 2005 earthquake. Many of the local people are farmers and herdsmen, though a lot of the people are working in middle east countries.
Hangrai is known for its natural environment. Local attractions and places include Magra, Jhamra, Shadal, Laamri and Naddi.Naddi bungalow a forest rest house is built by the British India situated in the middle of dense forest of Hangrai.
The first ever taxonomist viz Danish Ali, who first time explore the flora of Union council Hangrai  (Ali et al. 2019)

References 

Union councils of Mansehra District
Populated places in Mansehra District